Redwood City Ruckus were an American soccer team, founded in 2006, who played in the National Premier Soccer League (NPSL), the fourth tier of the American Soccer Pyramid, for just one season.

The Ruckus played their home matches in the stadium on the campus of Skyline College in the city of San Bruno, California, 15 miles north-east of Redwood City, California, near San Francisco. The team's colors were dark blue, red, white and green.

Year-by-year

References

Soccer clubs in the San Francisco Bay Area
National Premier Soccer League teams
2006 establishments in California
Association football clubs established in 2006
Association football clubs disestablished in 2006
2006 disestablishments in California
Sports in San Mateo County, California
San Bruno, California